Dario Pegoretti (18 January 1956 – 23 August 2018) was an Italian bicycle framebuilder based for many years in Caldonazzo, outside the town of Trento, in the Dolomites, Italy, and then later for a few years in Verona, Italy.

He was widely considered to be one of the great contemporary steel and aluminum bicycle framebuilders and a pioneer of lugless TIG welded frames.

Career
Pegoretti used only steel and aluminum to create his frames, primarily using drawn tubes (including custom shapes based on his specifications and designs)  from Excell, Dedacciai, and most recently Columbus. His most recent models included the Responsorium, Day is Done, Big Leg Emma, Mxxxxxo, Duende, Luigino, Love #3, and 8:30AM.

He apprenticed with master Italian framebuilder Luigino Milani, who was also his father-in-law.

Pegoretti designed and built frames that were ridden by professional cyclists Miguel Indurain, Marco Pantani, Stephen Roche, Claudio Chiappucci, Mario Cipollini, and Andrea Tafi among others.  He started out as a contract builder, making frames that were then branded by other manufacturers, including some Pinarello models, until the American distributor Giorgio Andretta/GITA convinced him to build under his own name. Floyd Landis owns and rides a Love #3.  He supplied comedian Robin Williams with bikes that the actor regularly used and particularly admired; and Williams also gave them as gifts.

Pegoretti also created custom paint and graphics designs for customers. The 'ciavate' paint scheme is entirely hand-painted by Dario and originally drew inspiration from Jean-Michel Basquiat. His work was highly creative, inventive, and very influenced by his deep love of music. His frame model names and graphic often included references to and/or quotations of his favorite musical and prose pieces.

In addition to running his framebuilding studio, Mr. Pegoretti was also a respected teacher, and lectured and taught seminars at various design schools.

Dario Pegoretti's famous slogan was "fatti con le  mani" ("made by hand") and he lived this motto completely. He constantly combined aspects of art, craft, and creativity, of the highest order and as very few if any bicycle framebuilders ever have.

Illness
In 2007, Pegoretti was diagnosed with lymphoma but had recovered.

On 23 August 2018 Dario Pegoretti died of heart failure at approximately 19:00 hours in Verona, Italy.

Awards
Pegoretti won the President's Choice award at the 2007 North American Handmade Bicycle Show and framebuilder of the year at the 2008 show.

See also

 List of bicycle parts
 List of Italian companies

References

External links
 Dario Pegoretti's Website
 Pegoretti page at Gita Bike
 Painting with Dario Pegoretti YouTube

1956 births
2018 deaths
People from Trento
Cycle manufacturers of Italy
Italian cycle designers